Leverage is a U.S. television drama series, which ran on TNT from December 7, 2008 to December 25, 2012. The series was produced by director/executive producer Dean Devlin's production company Electric Television. Leverage followed a five-person team made up of Alec Hardison, Eliot Spencer, Sophie Devereaux, Parker, and former insurance investigator Nate Ford, who used their skills to right corporate and governmental injustices inflicted on common citizens.

Leverage was canceled on December 21, 2012 amid falling ratings. The final episode, which was produced as a possible series finale, aired December 25, 2012.

A total of 77 episodes of Leverage were broadcast over five seasons.

Series overview

Episodes

Season 1 (2008–09)

Season 2 (2009–10)

Season 3 (2010)

Season 4 (2011–12)

Season 5 (2012)

References

External links 
 
 

Leverage (TV series)
Lists of American crime drama television series episodes